Jonathan G. Lebed (born September 29, 1984) is an American businessman and former stock trader who reached an out of court civil settlement with the U.S. Securities and Exchange Commission (SEC) at age 15 for stock manipulation.

Early life and education
Lebed was raised in Cedar Grove, New Jersey and graduated from Cedar Grove High School.

Career
Between September 1999 and February 2000, Lebed made hundreds of thousands of dollars from using a computer in his bedroom in Cedar Grove, New Jersey using pump and dump by posting in internet chat rooms and message boards, encouraging people to buy penny stocks he already owned, thus, according to the SEC, artificially raising the price of the stock. Between September 1999 and February 2000, his smallest one-day gain was US$12,000 while his biggest was $74,000. Lebed became the first minor prosecuted by the SEC. In 2001, Lebed and the SEC negotiated an out-of-court settlement in which Lebed forfeited $285,000 in profit and interest he had made on 11 trades without admitting any wrongdoing, allowing him to keep close to half a million dollars.

In 2003, Lebed was an unsuccessful candidate for the Cedar Grove township council.

Lebed's legal issues were profiled in an episode of the 2001 BBC documentary The Future Just Happened.

In 2010, he was living in Wayne, New Jersey and the sole owner of Lebed Biz LLC, which runs a website touting penny stocks. In 2008, a company won a $2.56 million judgment against Lebed.

References

Further reading

External links
 CBS News, "Pump and Dump"
 S.E.C. Desist order September 20, 2000
 S.E.C. Press release September 20, 2000

1984 births
Living people
American stock traders
People from Cedar Grove, New Jersey
People from Wayne, New Jersey
Pump and dump schemes